I M 24 is an Indian Hindi language comedy film directed by Saurabh Shukla starring Rajat Kapoor, Ranvir Shorey, Manjari Fadnis and Neha Dhupia. The film was released on 31 August 2012.

Plot 
The plot revolves around a 40 year old Subhendu Roy, falls in love with a much younger lady named Sheela. In order to attract her, he pretends to be a 24-year-old man, who works as a writer for prominent Bollywood director in an online chat. Subhendu Roy resides with his roommate Gagan, who is a struggling actor.

Cast 
Rajat Kapoor - Subhendu Roy
Ranvir Shorey - Gagan
Neha Dhupia - Sheela
Manjari Fadnis - Kanak
Saurabh Shukla - Bollywood Director Sidhwani
Delnaaz Irani - Delnaaz Paul
Lillete Dubey - Don's wife
Karan Singh Grover

References

2012 films